Planisphere is a 2009 poetry collection by the American writer John Ashbery. It consists of 99 alphabetically sequenced poems.

Reception
The book was reviewed in Publishers Weekly, where the critic wrote that Ashbery's "wit is still sharp, the poems still rife with clever juxtapositions and colliding voices", and that "as in his last several books, there's nothing entirely new, but ... the poems are almost always satisfying and strange".

See also
 2009 in poetry
 American literature

References

2009 poetry books
American poetry collections
Poetry by John Ashbery
HarperCollins books